The Primetime Emmy Award for Outstanding Production Design for Variety Special is awarded to one television special each year. Prior to the category's creation in 2016, specials and regular series competed together as Outstanding Production Design for a Variety, Nonfiction, Reality or Reality-Competition Programming. The two had also been divided in 1977 and 1978.

In the following list, the first titles listed in gold are the winners; those not in gold are nominees, which are listed in alphabetical order. The years given are those in which the ceremonies took place.



Winners and nominations

1970s
Outstanding Art Direction for a Comedy-Variety or Music Special

1980s

2010s
Outstanding Production Design for a Variety, Nonfiction, Event or Award Special

Outstanding Production Design for a Variety Special

2020s

Notes

References

External links
 Academy of Television Arts and Sciences website

Production Design for a Variety Special